Galahad, sometimes referred to as Galeas or Galath, among other versions of his name, is a knight of King Arthur's Round Table and one of the three achievers of the Holy Grail in Arthurian legend. He is the illegitimate son of Sir Lancelot du Lac and Lady Elaine of Corbenic and is renowned for his gallantry and purity as the most perfect of all knights. Emerging quite late in the medieval Arthurian tradition, Sir Galahad first appears in the Lancelot–Grail cycle, and his story is taken up in later works, such as the Post-Vulgate Cycle, and Sir Thomas Malory's Le Morte d'Arthur.

Origins
The story of Galahad and his quest for the Holy Grail is a relatively late addition to the Arthurian legend. Galahad does not feature in any romance by Chrétien de Troyes, or in Robert de Boron's Grail stories, or in any of the continuations of Chrétien's story of the mysterious castle of the Fisher King. He first appears in a 13th-century Old French Arthurian epic, the interconnected set of romances known as the Vulgate Cycle. His name could have been derived from the Welsh name Gwalchaved, meaning "Falcon of Summer".

The original conception of Galahad, whose adult exploits are first recounted in the fourth book of the Vulgate Cycle, may have come from the mystical Cistercian Order. According to some interpreters, the philosophical inspiration of the celibate, otherworldly character of the monastic knight Galahad came from this monastic order set up by St. Bernard of Clairvaux. The Cistercian-Bernardine concept of Catholic warrior asceticism that so distinguishes the character of Galahad also informs St. Bernard's projection of ideal chivalry in his work on the Knights Templar, the Liber ad milites templi de laude novae militiae. Significantly, in the narratives, Galahad is associated with a white shield with a vermilion cross, the very same emblem given to the Knights Templar by Pope Eugene III.

Medieval literature

Conception

The circumstances surrounding Galahad's conception derive from the earlier parts of Grail prose cycles. It takes place when King Arthur's greatest knight, Lancelot, mistakes Princess Elaine of Corbenic (originally known as Heliabel or Amite in the Vulgate Cycle) for his secret mistress, Queen Guinevere. Lady Elaine's father, King Pelles, has already received magical foreknowledge that Lancelot will give his daughter a child and that this little boy will grow to become the greatest knight in the world, the knight chosen by God to discover the Holy Grail. Pelles also knows that Lancelot will only lie with his one true love, Guinevere. Destiny will have to be helped along a little; therefore, a conclusion which prompts Pelles to seek out "one of the greatest enchantresses of the time," Dame Brusen, who gives Pelles a magic ring that makes Elaine take on the appearance of Guinevere and enables her to spend a night with Lancelot. On discovering the deception, Lancelot draws his sword on Elaine, but when he finds out that they have conceived a son together, he is immediately forgiving; however, he does not marry Elaine or even wish to be with her anymore and returns to Arthur's court (albeit years later they eventually come to live together for a time, after Elaine cures him of his severe and long madness caused by both herself and Guinevere). Galahad is born and placed in the care of a great aunt, who is an abbess at a nunnery, to be raised there.

According to the 13th-century Old French Prose Lancelot (part of the Vulgate Cycle), "Galahad" (actually written as Galaad, in some manuscripts also as Gaalaz or Galaaus) was Lancelot's original name, but it was changed when he was a child. At his birth, therefore, Galahad is given his father's own original name. Merlin prophesies that Galahad will surpass his father in valor and be successful in his search for the Holy Grail. Pelles, Galahad's maternal grandfather, is portrayed as a descendant of Joseph of Arimathea's brother-in-law Bron also known as Galahad (Galaad), whose line had been entrusted with the Grail by Joseph.

Grail Quest

Upon reaching adulthood (in medieval definition) of 15 years old, Galahad is finally united with his father Lancelot, who had never met him before that (not even during the years of living with Elaine). Lancelot knights Galahad after having been bested by him in a duel, the first and only time that Lancelot ever lost in a fair fight to anyone. Galahad is then brought to King Arthur's court at Camelot during Pentecost, where he is accompanied by a very old knight who immediately leads him over to the Round Table and unveils his seat at the Siege Perilous, an unused chair that has been kept vacant for the sole person who will succeed in the quest of the Holy Grail. For all others who have aspired to sit there, it has proved to be immediately fatal. Galahad survives this test, witnessed by Arthur who, upon realising the greatness of this new knight, leads him out to the river where a magic sword lies in a stone with an inscription reading "Never shall man take me hence but only he by whose side I ought to hang; and he shall be the best knight of the world." (The embedding of a sword in a stone is also an element of the legends of Arthur's original sword, the sword in the stone. In Malory's version, this is the sword that had belonged to Balin.) Galahad accomplishes this test with ease, and Arthur swiftly proclaims him to be the greatest knight ever. Galahad is promptly invited to become a Knight of the Round Table, and soon afterwards, Arthur's court witnesses an ethereal vision of the Grail. The quest to seek out this holy object is begun at once.

All of the Knights of the Round Table set out to find the Grail. It is Galahad who takes the initiative to begin the search for the Grail; the rest of the knights follow him. Arthur is sorrowful that all the knights have embarked thus, for he discerns that many will never be seen again, dying in their quest. Arthur fears that it is the beginning of the end of the Round Table. This might be seen as a theological statement that concludes that earthly endeavours must take second place to the pursuit of the holiness. Galahad, in some ways, mirrors Arthur, drawing a sword from a stone in the way that Arthur did. In this manner, Galahad is declared to be the chosen one.

Further uniquely among the Round Table, Galahad is capable of performing miracles such as banishing demons and healing the sick. For the most part, he travels alone during the Grail Quest, smiting (and often sparing) his enemies, rescuing fellow knights including Percival and saving maidens in distress until he is finally reunited with Bors and Percival. Together, the three blessed virgin knights come across Percival's sister, who leads them to the mystical Ship of Solomon. They use it to cross the sea to an island where Galahad finds King David's sword.

Ascension

After many adventures, Galahad and his companions find themselves in the mystical castle of Corbenic at the court of King Pelles and his son Eliazarr (Galahad does not reunite with his mother, who had died meanwhile). His grandfather and uncle bring Galahad into a room where he is finally allowed to see the Holy Grail. Galahad is asked to take the vessel to the holy island Sarras. After seeing the Grail, Galahad makes the request that he may die at the time of his choosing. So it is that, while making his way back to Arthur's court, Galahad is visited by the spirit of Joseph of Arimathea, and thus experiences such a glorious rapture that he makes his request to die. Galahad bids Percival and Bors farewell, after which angels appear to take him to Heaven. His ascension is witnessed by Bors and Percival. Depending on the telling, Galahad is either physically taken to paradise as he completely vanishes in a bright light or his mortal body is left behind and later buried by his friends (Galahad is laid to rest alongside the body of Percival's sister and later joined in their grave by Percival himself).

Galahad's success in the mystical religious endeavor that was the search for the Holy Grail was predicted before his birth, not only by Pelles but also by Merlin, who once had told Arthur's father Uther Pendragon that there was one who would fill the place at the "table of Joseph", but that he was not yet born. At first this knight was believed to be Percival, however it is later discovered to be Galahad. Galahad was conceived for the divine purpose of seeking the Holy Grail, but this happened through pure deceit; under a cloak of deception that was very similar, in fact, to that which led to the conception of Arthur and of Merlin himself. Despite this, Galahad is the knight who is chosen to find the Holy Grail. Galahad, in both the Lancelot-Grail cycle and in Malory's retelling, is exalted above all the other knights: he is the one worthy enough to have the Grail revealed to him and to be taken into Heaven.

Victorian portrayals

Tennyson

In Thomas Malory's Le Morte d'Arthur, Galahad's incredible prowess and fortune in the quest for the Holy Grail are traced back to his piety. According to the legend, only pure knights may achieve the Grail. While in a specific sense, this "purity" refers to chastity, Galahad appears to have lived a generally sinless life and as a result, he lives and thinks on a level entirely apart from the other knights around him. This quality is reflected in Alfred, Lord Tennyson's poem                   "Sir Galahad":

My good blade carves the casques of men, / My tough lance thrusteth sure, / My strength is as the strength of ten, / Because my heart is pure.

Galahad is able to conquer all of his enemies because he is pure. In the next verse of this poem, Tennyson continues to glorify Galahad for remaining pure at heart, by putting these words into his mouth:

I never felt the kiss of love, / Nor maiden's hand in mine.

Galahad pursues a single-minded and lonely course, sacrificing much in his determination to aspire to a higher ideal:

Then move the trees, the copses nod, / Wings flutter, voices hover clear / "O just and faithful knight of God! / Ride on! the prize is near."

Tennyson's poem follows Galahad's journey to find the Holy Grail but ends while he is still riding, still seeking, still dreaming; as if to say that the quest for the Holy Grail is an ongoing task. Unlike many other portrayals of the legend of Sir Galahad, Tennyson has Sir Galahad speak in the first person, giving the reader his thoughts and feelings as he rides on his quest, rather than just the details of his battles, as in Malory.

William Morris

Sir Galahad's thoughts and aspirations have been explored as well by William Morris in his poems The Chapel in Lyoness, published in 1856, and Sir Galahad, a Christmas Mystery, published in 1858. Unlike Malory and Tennyson's pure hero, Morris creates a Galahad who is emotionally complex, conflicted, and palpably human. In A Christmas Mystery, written more than twenty years after Tennyson's Sir Galahad, Galahad is "fighting an internal battle between the ideal and the human", and tries to reconcile his longing for earthly delights, such as the romantic exploits of Sir Palomydes and his father Sir Lancelot, and the "more austere spiritual goal to which he has been called". In the companion piece The Chapel in Lyoness, a knight lies dying in winter "in a bizarre realization of Galahad's nightmare vision of his own fate". Galahad then "saves" the knight with a kiss before he finally expires. It is here that Galahad progresses from "a somewhat self-centered figure" to "a savior capable of imparting grace". Morris' poems place this emotional conflict at centre stage, rather than concentrating upon Galahad's prowess for defeating external enemies, and the cold and the frost of a Christmas period serve to reinforce his "chilly isolation". The poem opens on midwinter's night; Sir Galahad has been sitting for six hours in a chapel, staring at the floor. He muses to himself:

Night after night your horse treads down alone / The sere damp fern, night after night you sit / Holding the bridle like a man of stone, / Dismal, unfriended: what thing comes of it?

Twentieth century and later

Literature
 A poem by Thomas de Beverly published in 1925, "The Birth of Sir Galahad", tells of the events leading up to the conception of Sir Galahad, his birth and a visit soon afterwards by Sir Bors, to see Elaine and the baby Galahad. Sir Bors sees a vision of the Holy Grail whilst in a chapel with the baby and his mother. Of the three knights who are untainted by sin – Sir Perceval, Sir Bors, and Sir Galahad – Galahad is the only one predestined to achieve this honor of attaining the Holy Grail. This is similar to God declaring that King David had shed much blood and was not worthy of building the Jerusalem Temple, this honour falling only to his son King Solomon.<ref>1 Chronicles, Ch. 22, 8, – quoted in Alec G. Warner, Biblical Motives in Twentieth Century Literature" in Barbara Kid (ed.) "New Essays on British and American Literature", New York, 1982.</ref>
Edmund Wilson's story "Galahad", published in 1927, presents a humorous story about the attempted seduction of a virginal high school student by a debutante.
 In John Erskine's novel Galahad: Enough of His Life to Explain His Reputation, Galahad's main tutor for his knightly training is Queen Guinevere. Erskine follows Malory's text through Galahad's childhood. Just as in Le Morte d'Arthur, Galahad grows up in the court of his mother Elaine, and travels to King Arthur's court to be reunited with his father and to become a knight. When Galahad arrives at the court, Guinevere is upset with Lancelot because he does not want to be her lover anymore, and she takes an interest in the young knight, persuading him to go above and beyond regular knightly duties. At first Galahad seems content with just being an ordinary Knight of the Round Table, going out on quests and saving maidens in distress. Guinivere is the main contributor to Galahad's destiny in this work. She says, "You'll waste your life if you don't accomplish something new, something entirely your own." This is Galahad's motivation to seek the Grail.
 Matt Cohen satirizes Galahad's virtuous character in his short story "Too Bad Galahad". Cohen describes Galahad as the perfect knight who does no harm. In part, "Galahad's virtue is a compensation for Lancelot's indiscretion". However, Cohen, instead of glorifying Galahad's virtuous character, makes it into a weakness. He writes that Galahad tried to "swear and kill and wench with the rest of the knights but he could never really get into it." Cohen's Galahad is not well-liked by the other knights because he is so perfect and seems unapproachable. Cohen pokes fun at Galahad's "calling" by saying that his life would be wasted if he failed to remain pure and holy in order to be the bearer of the Holy Grail.
 Thomas Berger's Arthur Rex portrays Galahad differently. In most works, Galahad is depicted as an emblem of perfection. Berger shows Galahad's arrival to court in a more satirical light. Gawain comments that he cannot tell whether he is male or female. Berger shows that even though Galahad is in fact the greatest knight in the world, he does not appear to be. Appearance versus reality is a common theme throughout this novel. In most versions of the story of Sir Galahad, Galahad's death comes about after his greatest achievement, that of the Holy Grail. In Arthur Rex, however, Galahad is killed in a battle where he mistakes his own father Lancelot for a Saxon. Galahad is too weak and sleeps through most of the battle and, when he does wake up, he kills his father as well as being killed himself. Just like the Grail, perfection is unattainable; only glimpses of the Grail and of perfection can be seen.
 In the Everworld fantasy novel series by K. A. Applegate, the character David Levin fights with the Sword of Galahad, after witnessing Sir Galahad's death. David is the self-appointed leader of the protagonists and takes on all the burdens of the group, being troubled by his past in which he was cowardly and feeling he must prove himself to be a man – in which could be seen some parallels with Galahad's life.
 In Ayn Rand's novel We the Living, the character Andrei Taganov, an honest and idealistic revolutionary Communist, sacrifices his career and resorts to blackmail in order to save the life of Leo, the lover of Kira—the woman that Andrei loves; though hating Leo and intensely jealous of him, Andrei puts Kira's happiness before his own. The villain Pavel Syerov calls Andrei in derision "Sir Galahad of the blackmail sword"; thereupon, Andrei accepts the comparison as appropriate.The Lady of the Lake, the final book of The Witcher saga by Andrzej Sapkowski, features Knight Galaad of Caer Benic, working for King Arthur. At the very beginning of the story, as a denizen of a parallel world, he encounters Cirilla of Cintra and calls her the Lady of the Lake.
In Sam Selvon's 1956 novel The Lonely Londoners, central character Moses Aloesa meets fellow Trinidadian émigré Henry Oliver and nicknames him Galahad.
 Neil Gaiman's short story "Chivalry" from Smoke & Mirrors includes Galahad in his quest for the Holy Grail.
 Galahad appears as a child toward the conclusion of British author Giles Kristian's novel Lancelot (2018). The sequel, Camelot (2020), is set a decade later, with Galahad as the protagonist.

Music
 Joan Baez uses the legend metaphorically in her song "Sweet Sir Galahad", which is about the courtship of her sister.
 The band America mentions Galahad ("... or the tropic of Sir Galahad") in the chorus for the song "Tin Man".
 On his EP To the Yet Unknowing World, Josh Ritter has a song titled "Galahad", which jokes about Galahad's chastity and the 'virtue' of his supposed purity.
 In Mili's song "Ga1ahad and Scientific Witchery", Galahad is portrayed as a robotic knight who was reanimated by a witch.
Marty Stuart uses part of the last stanza in the outro of the concept album The Pilgrim. Johnny Cash speaks as God, describing the Pilgrim as a just and faithful knight, before singing the final line of the album.
 On The Mechanisms album ‘High Noon Over Camelot’, Galahad is portrayed as a preacher man given true sight and clarity, thus going on to lead the three Pendragons (Arthur, Guinevere, and Lancelot) to find the Holy Grail. 

Film and television
 Galahad is portrayed by George Reeves in the 1949 film serial Adventures of Sir Galahad.
 Galahad is portrayed by Michael Palin in Monty Python and the Holy Grail. The movie makes a satire of Galahad's purity as his chastity is put to the test when he finds a castle full of sexually charged nuns. 
 In the 1998 miniseries Merlin, the title character meets Galahad and his parents while looking for a suitable regent for Camelot while Arthur searches for the Grail. Merlin brings Lancelot back with him, and after the sorrows that subsequently befall Camelot, the Lady of the Lake reveals that Merlin was meant to pick Galahad and that his mistake proves how human he truly is. 
 Galahad is portrayed by Hugh Dancy in the 2004 historical action-adventure film King Arthur.
 John Larroquette played an elderly yet immortal Galahad (now known as Jenkins) in the TV series The Librarians.
 Galahad is a Knightmare frame piloted by the Knight of One, Bismarck Waldstein, in the anime Code Geass.
 In the film Kingsman: The Secret Service and its sequel, Galahad is the code name of Colin Firth's character Harry Hart, later assumed by Taron Egerton's character, Gary "Eggsy" Unwin. It was used by Gemma Arterton's character Polly Watkins in the prequel.

Games
He is represented by Silver the Hedgehog in the 2009 video game Sonic and the Black Knight.
 In the 2015 video game The Order: 1886, the main character is an heir to the title of Sir Galahad, and is therefore referred to as such.
In the video game Fate/Grand Order, Galahad is a Heroic Spirit that was fused with a girl, making the Demi-Servant Mash Kyrielight, under the class of Shielder.
 The card game Android: Netrunner features a card named Galahad. It belongs to a sub-category of Intrusion Countermeasures Electronics called "Grail," to which Lancelot, Merlin, and Excalibur also belong.
 The board game Shadows Over Camelot features Sir Galahad as one of the characters that the players can select.
 The video game Starlancer has a torpedo ship type named after Galahad.

See also
HMS Sir Galahad – three Royal Navy vessels named after him, including one lost in the Falklands War

References

Bibliography
 Atkinson, Stephen C. B. "Prophecy and Nostalgia: Arthurian Symbolism at the Close of the English Middle Ages". In Mary F. Braswell and John Bugge (eds.), Arthurian Tradition Essays in Convergence. Tuscaloosa: University of Alabama, 1988. 90–95. Print. Atkinson analyses Malory's motives for writing about the Holy Grail quest. He compares the knights and focuses on how Galahad sticks out from the rest of the knights.
 Berger, Thomas. Arthur Rex: A Legendary Novel. Boston: Little, Brown, 1990. Print.
 Cohen, Matt. Too Bad Galahad. Toronto: The Coach House Press, 1972. Print. A comical approach to the legend of Sir Galahad, his quest for the Holy Grail, and his pure character is made to seem foolish.
 De Beverley, Thomas. "The Birth of Sir Galahad" 1925. This poem gives details regarding how Elaine, daughter of King Pellas, receives a magic ring that will trick Lancelot into sleeping with her and conceiving Galahad.
 Erskine, John. Galahad: Enough of His Life to Explain His Reputation. Indianapolis: The Bobbs-Merrill Company, 1926. Print. Follows the story of Galahad's conception and his whole life. Underlines the influence of Guinevere on Galahad's knightly training, which ultimately pushed him to exceed all others who surrounded him.
 Kennedy, Edward D. "Visions of History: Robert de Boron and English Arthurian Chroniclers". Fortunes of King Arthur. Cambridge: D.S. Brewer, 2005. 29+. Print. Examines the relationships between the Holy Grail quest and Galahad by giving overviews of other Author's inquires.
 Malory, Thomas. Le Morte Darthur: The Winchester Manuscript. New York: Oxford University Press, 1998. Print. Follows the quest for the Holy Grail and how Galahad became knighted by his father.
 Mieszkowski, Gretchen. "The Prose Lancelots Galehot, Malory’s Lavin, and the Queering of Late Medieval Literature.” Arthuriana 5.1 (1995): 21–51.
 Ruud, Jay. "Thomas Berger's Arthur Rex: Galahad and Earthly Power". Critique 25.2 (1984): 92–99. Print. This text expresses how Galahad epitomised perfection in knightly-hood, the clear emulation of him by other knights and the truth behind his personal actions.
 Stevenson, Catherine B., and Virginia Hale. "Medieval Drama and Courtly Romance in William Morris' 'Sir Galahad, A Christmas Mystery. Victorian Poetry 38.3 (2000): 383–391. Print. Shows how Galahad is depicted in William Morris' "Sir Galahad, A Christmas Mystery". Displays Galahad's struggle between being perfect and being human.
 Tennyson, Alfred. "Sir Galahad". Galahad and the Grail . University of British Columbia. Web. 17 November 2009. This site contained many pictures depicting Galahad accompanied by groups of angels. The story accounts Galahad's emotions before embarking on the quest for the Grail.
 Waite, Arthur. The Holy Grail: The Galahad Quest in the Arthurian Literature''. New York: University Books, 1961. Print. This text gives a detailed discourse covering Galahad's life story from his birth to his death, with specific emphasis on his contribution to the quest for the Holy Grail.

External links

Galahad at The Camelot Project

Fictional offspring of rape
Fictional swordfighters
Knights of the Round Table